Founded in 1950, Louisville Eastern High School is located off Old Shelbyville Road in Middletown, Kentucky and Woodland Hills, Kentucky, United States, a cities within the merged government of Louisville, KY. With an enrollment of over 2,000 students, this school has been the pilot for education partnerships with companies such as IBM, Dell, CompTIA, Adobe, and Microsoft.

History
Eastern opened in 1950 on its present site in Middletown. The library was later added to the front of the school, giving the building a layout in the shape of the letter "E". The school has been part of the Jefferson County school system since before the county system aborted the old Louisville city school system. The school was co-educational from its start and was integrated long before busing was ordered in Jefferson County.

In 2009, James A. Sexton, principal at Eastern for 20 years, retired. His place was taken by Lana Kaelin.

Academics
Eastern has been repeatedly ranked in the top 1,300 high schools in the United States by Newsweek.

Athletics

Eastern offers varsity and junior varsity teams in baseball, basketball, Cheerleading, chess, cross country, field hockey, American football, golf, ice hockey, rifle, cardboard sword fighting, lacrosse, ping pong, softball, soccer, swimming, track and field, tennis, colorguard/winterguard, marching band, volleyball and wrestling.

Special classes
Eastern is the only school within the Jefferson County Public Schools to offer ballroom dancing classes, Japanese as a language course, and has 36 different technology classes.

Notable alumni
 Ned Beatty, class of 1955, award-winning character actor
 John Cowan, musician, currently a member of the Doobie Brothers
 Chris Dowe (born 1991), professional basketball player for Maccabi Haifa
 Hugh Durham, class of 1955, former head basketball coach at the University of Georgia
 Ashley Eicher, class of 1998, 2004 Miss Tennessee
 Colin Holba, class of 2012, NFL long snapper
 Carroll Hubbard, class of 1955, former member of the United States House of Representatives
 Nate Morris, Founder and CEO of Rubicon Technologies
 Myron Pryor, class of 2004, football player for the University of Kentucky and New England Patriots
 Rajon Rondo, professional basketball player
 Felton Spencer, class of 1986, former NBA basketball player for the Minnesota Timberwolves, Utah Jazz, Orlando Magic and San Antonio Spurs; 6th overall pick in the 1990 NBA draft
 William S. Wallace, class of 1965, four-star general in the United States Army, commanded all U.S. forces during the 2003 invasion of Iraq
 Todd Wellemeyer, class of 1997, Major League Baseball player

See also
 List of public schools in Louisville, Kentucky

References

External links
 

Jefferson County Public Schools (Kentucky)
Public high schools in Kentucky
Magnet schools in Kentucky
Middletown, Kentucky
Educational institutions established in 1950
1950 establishments in Kentucky
High schools in Louisville, Kentucky